24th Street station is a station on the Blue Line of the San Diego Trolley located in National City, California. The stop serves both as a commuter center with a park and ride lot and to provide access to the dense nearby retail area.

History

This station was renovated, starting January 13, 2014 as part of the Trolley Renewal Project; it reopened with a renovated station platform in September 2014.

Station layout
There are two tracks, each with a side platform.

See also
 List of San Diego Trolley stations

References

Blue Line (San Diego Trolley)
Railway stations in the United States opened in 1981
1981 establishments in California
San Diego Trolley stations